The FIM Trials European Championship is organised by the Fédération Internationale de Motocyclisme and has been held since 1992. The championship gives up and coming riders a chance to compete at international level against top class riders, many who have progressed to become champions in the FIM Trial World Championship such as current champion Toni Bou and past champions Dougie Lampkin and Adam Raga

History
The Inaugural championship was held in 1992 with a single class format. In 1999 a women's class was added in part due to the addition of a women's class In the FIM Trial World Championship series the previous year. In 2004 a European Junior class was added, with many riders starting in the junior class before progressing through to the Pro class main series. An example of this is British rider Alexz Wigg who won the Junior title in 2006 and after moving up won the Pro series in 2010.

FIM European Trials Champions

Wins per country 
As of November 2018, the following ranking shows the countries with most European titles, in Pro, Junior, Women's and total:

See also 
 Trial des Nations
 Scott Trial
 FIM Trial World Championship
 NATC Trials Championship
 Scottish Six Days Trial

References

External links 
  Trials world champions at FIM website

Motorcycle trials
World motorcycle racing series
Motorcycle off-road racing series